Michael George "Mike" Johnson (13 October 1941 – 1991) was a Welsh international central defender who played for Swansea Town in the 1960s.

Johnson spent several years as understudy to Mel Nurse before replacing the Welsh international following his move to Middlesbrough. He made one appearance for Wales during his career, in a 3–2 defeat to Northern Ireland in April 1964.

References

Welsh footballers
1941 births
1991 deaths
Footballers from Swansea
Swansea City A.F.C. players
Worcester City F.C. players
English Football League players
Wales under-23 international footballers
Wales international footballers
Association football defenders